Gorogobius is a genus of gobies native to the Atlantic coast of Africa.

Species
Two recognized species are in this genus:
 Gorogobius nigricinctus (Delais, 1951)
 Gorogobius stevcici Kovačić & Schliewen, 2008

References

 
Gobiidae